Mount Defiance may refer to:

In Australia

In the United States

See also
Defiance Mountain
Mount Defiant